The Tanimbar cuckoo-dove (Macropygia timorlaoensis) is a species of bird in the family Columbidae.
It is endemic to the Tanimbar Islands in Indonesia. It was previously grouped together with the Timor cuckoo-dove and the Flores Sea cuckoo-dove as the dusky or bar-necked cuckoo-dove.

References

 Ng, E.Y.X., J.A. Eaton, P. Verbelen, R.O. Hutchinson, and F.E. Rheindt. 2016. Using bioacoustic data to test species limits in an Indo-Pacific island radiation of Macropygia cuckoo doves. Biological Journal of the Linnean Society 118: 786–812.

Tanimbar cuckoo-dove
Birds of the Tanimbar Islands
Tanimbar cuckoo-dove